Andrea Šerić (born 3 August 1985) is a former Croatian female handballer who played as a line player for Turkish Super League club Kastamonu Bld. GSK and the  Croatia national team.

International honours
EHF Cup:
Finalist: 2006
Semifinalist: 2017–18

References

External links

1985 births
Living people
Sportspeople from Split, Croatia
Croatian female handball players
Olympic handball players of Croatia
Handball players at the 2012 Summer Olympics
Croatian expatriate sportspeople in Slovenia
Croatian expatriate sportspeople in Hungary
Croatian expatriate sportspeople in Turkey
Croatian expatriate sportspeople in Romania 
Expatriate handball players in Turkey
RK Podravka Koprivnica players